Chrome is a 2003 first-person shooter video game developed by Techland and published by Gathering of Developers in Europe and Strategy First in North America. It was re-released with additional levels in 2004 as Advanced Battlegrounds: The Future of Combat (in some countries called Chrome: Gold Edition). A prequel, Chrome SpecForce, was released in 2005. In March 2006, Techland announced a sequel, which would feature the latest version of the Chrome Engine, but was reported to be "on hold" soon after.

Gameplay 

Chrome is a first-person shooter, and most of the gameplay involves traversing 3D environments by foot and fighting human enemies with an array of ranged weapons. Occasionally, the player has to solve simple puzzles and find keys that allow to enter new areas. What made Chrome stand out upon its release was that a large part of the game's action takes place in vast open areas, providing some tactical freedom to the player. The player is also able to utilize six different kinds of vehicles that allow for fast movement and provide protection as well as heavy weaponry in some cases. Another feature that was not common at the time was the ability to slightly zoom in with every kind of weapon.

Despite being a rather classical linear FPS game the developers included several features atypical for this kind of game, some of which were inspired by System Shock 2 and Deus Ex that utilize more RPG mechanics. There is a wide array of items that the player can pick up, this not only includes weapons, ammo and health packs but also food or even CD players which have no practical purpose (but can be used to play short music loops). Inventory space is limited and the items are being managed on an inventory screen similar to those seen in System Shock 2 and Deus Ex. The player sometimes has to rearrange items and has to decide which weapons to take with him. Before all missions, aside from the first one, the player has the ability to customize his weapons loadout.

Another feature inspired by Deus Ex is the ability to use implants. Over the course of the campaign Logan automatically receives implants which give him superhuman abilities such as increased accuracy, movement speed, jump height, zoom level or even reaction time which is simulated by introducing slow motion (generally known as Bullet Time among gamers). The use of these implants, however, causes a physical strain that may hurt Logan if they are not deactivated in time. This strain is symbolized by an additional energy bar which automatically refills over time but can also be replenished by using special items. All implants can be managed separately but it is also possible to create four groups of implants that will be activated or deactivated at once. For example, the player is able to create one group consisting of increased accuracy and a higher zoom level which could be utilized for long-distance combat and another one consisting of slow motion and increased movement speed for close combat. At first the efficiency of the implants is rather low and the strain very high but over the course of the campaign Logan gets used to them which results in him being able to use them for longer and gain higher bonuses.

Plot

Synopsis 

The game takes place in the distant future and the player assumes the role of bounty hunter Bolt Logan. On the first assignment in the game he is betrayed by his partner and gets ambushed. He survives and while trying to escape the complex he meets a woman named Carrie. He does not know her motivations but as they are both trying to escape the guards they decide to work together. After successfully leaving the planet she becomes his new partner who will support him via radio on all future assignments. As the game progresses the two discover a great conspiracy involving the discovery of the most valuable resource known to mankind: "chrome". They make contact with several factions and on the final mission it is up to the player to decide which faction Logan will stick with.

Story

Chrome takes place in the final years of the 22nd century, and opens with partners Bolt Logan (Jon St. John) and Ron "Pointer" Hertz, former special forces members turned freelancers, engaging on a routine mission to the planet Zorg to retrieve corporate blueprints that have been stolen by an unknown party. During the mission, Logan is betrayed and left to die by Pointer, who states his resentment of "being held back" by Logan and desire to prove his own superiority. Pointer also frames Logan for the theft of the blueprints, in case he survives. Logan meets up with another freelancer named Carrie, a computer hacker, and the two of them team up to escape the planet.

One year later, Logan and Carrie have become business partners, traveling to the remote Valkyria system to engage in freelance bounty missions. Their initial missions are on behalf of the mining corporation SPACON, battling a group of pirates that have been hijacking SPACON transport ships and have also kidnapped a nanotechlogy scientist, Dr. Shybkov. The pirates turn out to be led by Jurgen Dexon, another form special forces associate of Logan who he describes as a sadist. Logan succeeds in rescuing Dr. Shybkov, and shoots down a shuttle carrying Dexon as he attempts to escape, seemingly killing him.

Later, Logan and Carrie are contracted by SPACON to help colonists on the planet Terbon fight off attacks by a gang of thugs called the Hannibals. Logan rescues the daughter of the colony's leader, John Brown, and succeeds in killing the Hannibal leader. However, he learns that a single operative (revealed to be Pointer) has single-handedly massacred the entire SPACON corporation, effectively dissolving the company. SPACON's assets are absorbed by the larger Coretech corporation, with which they had been partners. Coretech's representative, Nicole Parker, contacts Logan and reveals that Dexon and the Hannibals were in the employ of the Zetrox corporation, who want to drive off the colonists from Terbon to seize the resources on their land. Logan embarks on Coretech's behalf to a Zetrox space station to retrieve evidence of Zetrox's illegal actions. Logan succeeds in retrieving the evidence, and escapes after a shootout with Ming Tse, Zetrox's representative. However, Nicole Parker is captured by Zetrox soldiers while on her way to delivering the evidence against Zetrox to the government. Logan succeeds in rescuing her, in the process killing Jurgen Dexon, who had survived the shuttle crash and been rebuilt by Zetrox with bionic implants and cybernetic limbs in order to lead the kidnapping operation.

Coretech contacts Logan and informs him that Zetrox has developed a nanovirus using Dr. Shybkov's research, which Coretech claims Zetrox plans to use to exterminate the Terbon colonists. They hire Logan to destroy the Zetrox warehouses containing the nanovirus, while implying that Pointer is the Zetrox commander overseeing the warehouses and the mission will give Logan a chance at revenge against him. However, the mission turns out to be a double-cross; Pointer is revealed to be working for Coretech, who were the ones behind the destruction of SPACON. Logan was sent to the Zetrox facility as a distraction so Pointer and his Coretech forces could steal the nanovirus and use it on the colonists. Pointer reveals that the Terbon colonists have discovered Chrome, the most valuable resource in the universe, which is why the corporations are fighting over the planet. Logan is again left to die by Pointer, but is rescued by Nicole Parker, who defects from Coretech after learning of their duplicity. Logan and Parker travel to a Coretech facility to try and stop them from using the nanovirus; however, Parker is killed by Pointer, who escapes to Terbon with the nanovirus. Logan pursues him and succeeds in killing him just before he can deploy the nanovirus against the colonists.

With Pointer dead, Logan's revenge is complete and he and Carrie are ready to wash their hands of the entire affair, when they are contacted by Zetrox, Coretech, and the Terbon colonists. Zetrox's representative Ming Tse reveals that they have used their wealth and influence to quash the evidence against them Logan gathered, and now they want to hire him to help them forcibly relocate the colonists in order to claim their Chrome-rich land; Ming Tse promises that the colonists will not be harmed, stating that Zetrox plays hard but does so transparently. Coretech, in contrast, wants to hire Logan to exterminate the Terbon colonists, threatening to release incriminating information they have on Logan to the authorities if he decides not to work for them. Finally, John Brown and the colonists want Logan to help them defend their homes from the corporations, a seemingly hopeless fight. At this point, the player can choose to side with Zetrox, Coretech, or the colonists, leading to 3 separate final missions and endings.

If the player sides with Zetrox, Logan will help them defend the colony from a Coretech assault. Zetrox will forcibly relocate the colonists, leaving them without homes. Logan states that the colonists should be grateful to still be alive, and that he has no regrets. Carrie, disillusioned by the whole affair, decides to end her partnership with Logan.

If the player sides with Coretech, Carrie will quit on the spot, disgusted by Logan's willingness to commit mass murder for money. Logan will kill all the armed male colonists defending the colony, finally assassinating the colonist leader John Brown. Coretech's lawyers find a way to remove Zetrox from the Valkyria system, and Coretech will congratulate Logan on his work and offer him Pointer's former position with them.

If Logan sides with the colonists, the government will storm Coretech's offices, removing them from the equation. Logan then helps the colonists fight off a Zetrox assault. With her forces defeated, Ming Tse will threaten to wipe out the colony with the nanovirus unless they surrender to Zetrox's authority. Logan succeeds in disabling the nanovirus bombs, killing Ming Tse in a final showdown when she tries to stop him. The grateful colonists offer to share the wealth from their newfound Chrome with Logan and Carrie, who discuss taking a well-earned vacation.

Development 

The game utilizes an engine that was specifically developed for this project. It is the first version of the Chrome Engine and would be used in all of Techland's major future releases and also licensed to several third-party developers. The engine is notable for being able to handle vast open areas as well as detailed interiors. It also allowed the implementation of simple vehicle physics as well as a ragdoll effect for dead characters.

The game's scripting engine is written entirely in Java. The Java source code is freely available and can be extracted from the code pack shipped with the game.

The game was later repackaged as Advanced Battlegrounds: The Future of Combat. Some changes were made, mostly fixing instability issues.

Reception 

Chrome is known as the first action game developed in Poland to get a major international release and receive "average" reviews beyond the country's borders, according to the review aggregation website Metacritic.

Expansion packs 

Advanced Battlegrounds: The Future of Combat

Advanced Battlegrounds: The Future of Combat, known in Europe as Chrome Gold Edition, is a standalone expansion pack released in 2004 by Deep Silver and DreamCatcher Interactive.  It received "mixed" reviews according to Metacritic.

Chrome SpecForce

Chrome SpecForce is a standalone expansion pack released in 2005 by Deep Silver and TopWare Interactive.

Chrome SpecForce is a strike force unit of the Federal Expeditionary Corps (FEC). They are tasked with maintaining the Federation's stability and keeping order. They are used for missions such as high-profile assassination, espionage, infiltration, and sabotage of enemy territory. The protagonist of the game is Logan, a member of SpecForce. The main goal of the game is to fight a corporation engaged in criminal activity on a planet called Estrella. SpecForce's members are given the latest equipment, such as Power Armor. The game has elements of strategy, large maps, and multiplayer.

The gameplay in Chrome SpecForce is largely identical to that of Chrome, although it has been streamlined, while the overall difficulty has also been lowered. The player can survive significantly more damage (ostensibly due to wearing Power Armor), healing and ammo items are more common-place, and the control scheme has been condensed so as to require fewer separate commands.

The plot is also simpler; cutscenes are minimal, with most of the story told in the mission briefings. The game serves as a prequel to Chrome, featuring Bolt Logan and Ron "Pointer" Hertz in their days as members of the military special forces. The two are sent to the planet Estrella to perform sabotage on the LoreGen corporation, who have been producing an illegal performance-enhancing stimulant derived from the planet's native dinosaur-like predators, and selling it to the mafia. However, the mission goes awry and the two are stranded on the planet when LoreGen succeeds in destroying their ship and killing the rest of their squad, including their commanding officer. The two meet Cartwright, a member of a local resistance movement fighting against LoreGen, and ally with the resistance to battle LoreGen. Cartwright is killed in a later mission, but Logan succeeds in disabling LoreGen's computer network with a computer virus, allowing the rebels to storm LoreGen's headquarters. Logan assists Weber, the leader of the resistance, in assaulting the LoreGen HQ. In the process, Logan succeeds in destroying LoreGen's stockpile of the stimulant as well as eliminating their prototype SW4 super-soldiers, Power Armor units boosted to superhuman levels with the stimulant. Logan finally defeats LoreGen's head of security, "General" Stanton, allowing the rebels to take the planet. Logan and Pointer contact the authorities to clean up the situation. Afterwards, a mysterious faction discusses their own operations, and states that they will succeed where LoreGen failed.

Chrome SpecForce received "mixed" reviews according to Metacritic.

References

External links 
 
 
 
 Official Chrome website

2003 video games
First-person shooters
Gathering of Developers games
Science fiction video games
Strategy First games
Techland games
Video games developed in Poland
Video games set in the 22nd century
Video games set on fictional planets
Video games with expansion packs
Windows games
Windows-only games
Multiplayer and single-player video games